Lori Garbacz (born August 11, 1958) is an American  professional golfer who played on the LPGA Tour for sixteen years.

College career 
From South Bend, Indiana, Garbacz attended the University of Florida in Gainesville, where she played for coach Mimi Ryan's Florida Gators women's golf team in 1977 and 1978.  The 1978 team was the runner-up at the Association for Intercollegiate Athletics for Women (AIAW) national championship tournament.  Garbacz was recognized as a first-team All-American in 1978.

Professional career 
Garbacz turned professional in 1979, and played on the LPGA Tour until 1995.  After taking much of the 1988 season off, her only win on the tour came the next year in 1989 at the Circle K LPGA Tucson Open. In major championships, she finished in third place twice: at the 1984 U.S. Women's Open and at the 1985 LPGA Championship.

Garbacz gained a measure of notoriety at the U.S. Women's Open in 1991 when she protested the slow play at the event, primarily due to inexperienced qualifiers. She asked her caddy to call Domino's Pizza from a payphone near the 14th hole and had a  pizza delivered to the 17th tee, which she shared with her group and the one ahead, which was still waiting to play. Rounds took well over five hours.

Her career winnings as a professional golfer totaled $911,483.

Professional wins

LPGA Tour wins (1)

LPGA Tour playoff record (0–2)

See also 

List of Florida Gators women's golfers on the LPGA Tour
List of University of Florida alumni

References

External links 
Garbacz's Profile on UF sports site
Results at golfobserver.com

American female golfers
Florida Gators women's golfers
LPGA Tour golfers
1958 births
Living people